Tivodrassus is a genus of Mexican long-spinneret ground spiders that was first described by Ralph Vary Chamberlin & Vaine Wilton Ivie in 1936. It was transferred to the ground spiders in 2018, but was returned to Prodidominae in 2022.

Species
 it contains four species, found only in Mexico:
Tivodrassus ethophor Chamberlin & Ivie, 1936 (type) – Mexico
Tivodrassus farias Platnick & Shadab, 1976 – Mexico
Tivodrassus pecki Platnick & Shadab, 1976 – Mexico
Tivodrassus reddelli Platnick & Shadab, 1976 – Mexico

See also
 List of Prodidominae species

References

Araneomorphae genera
Prodidominae
Spiders of Mexico